Charles Phipps may refer to:

Charles Phipps (Royal Navy officer) (1753–1786), British naval officer and Member of Parliament
Charles Beaumont Phipps (1801–1866), British soldier and courtier
Charles J. Phipps (1835–1897), English architect
Charles Nicholas Paul Phipps (1845–1913), English landowner and Conservative Member of Parliament
Charles Paul Phipps (1815–1880), English merchant and Conservative Member of Parliament